Glen Murray may refer to:

People
Glen Murray (ice hockey) (born 1972), Canadian former ice hockey right winger
Glen Murray (politician) (born 1957), Canadian politician

Places
Glen Murray, New Zealand, a locality in the former Franklin District

See also
Glenn Murray (born 1983), English footballer
Glenn Murray (baseball) (born 1970), baseball player